The Black Kettle National Grassland, in Roger Mills County, Oklahoma and Hemphill County, Texas, contains  of which  are in Oklahoma.

Named for the Indian leader Black Kettle, the grassland is managed by the Cibola National Forest, which also manages the Rita Blanca National Grassland in Dallam County, Texas and Cimarron County, Oklahoma, and McClellan Creek National Grassland in Gray County, Texas.

Setting
The National Grassland consists of about 100 tracts of land interspaced with privately owned ranchland. It is located in the mixed grass prairie region. The terrain is characterized by sandy and red slate hills in addition to grassland and oak brush. The creek bottoms are wooded with cottonwood, elm, and hackberry. Wildlife includes white-tailed deer, turkey and quail. The Washita River flows through the grassland. It is a small stream here near its headwaters, only a few feet wide and shallow. The nearest town is Cheyenne where the Grassland headquarters is located.

History

This Black Kettle National Grassland was home to the Comanche and other nomadic Indian tribes who camped and hunted in the area, attracted by abundant water and wood and buffalo herds. In 1868 Lt. Col. George Armstrong Custer led an attack on a Cheyenne village here in what was called the Battle of the Washita. The Grassland is named for Black Kettle (Cheyenne: Mo'ohtavetoo'o), the Southern Cheyenne leader killed in the river fleeing the attack. The area became part of the Cheyenne and Arapaho Indian reservation in 1867, but the treaty lands were partitioned and shrunk by multiple federal acts, including the Dawes Act which carved the land into parcels owned by individual households, and was opened to private settlement in 1892. Farmers enjoyed many years of good crops during an unusually wet period, especially wheat, until the Dust Bowl years of the 1930s. "Poor conservation and agricultural practices, combined with periods of wind, drought, and rain stripped the area of its topsoil" and the government bought the land from bankrupt farmers. In 1938, the Soil Conservation Service began a replanting and restoration effort and in 1960 it was designated a national grassland. The grassland is used for recreation, oil and gas production, and cattle grazing.

Recreation
There are three developed recreation areas in Oklahoma and one in Texas. A  hiking trail circles the lake. Lake Marvin in Texas is 63 acres (25 ha) acres in size. All lakes offer fishing, picnicking, and primitive camping sites. Hiking, wildlife observation, and hunting are permitted on most of the National Grasslands acreage.

The Washita Battlefield National Historic Site is located just west of Cheyenne and offers a  walking trail, a visitors center, and a panoramic view of the Battlefield and the National Grassland.

North of the Grassland is the South Canadian River which flows through a steep and hilly canyon. On the northern side of the River in Ellis County is the Packsaddle Wildlife Management Area,  of mixed grass prairie, forested river bottomland, and colorful red sand hills. Hunting for white-tailed deer, quail, and turkey is popular. Near Packsaddle is the Nature Conservancy's Four Canyon Preserve,  of similar terrain. The Conservancy is attempting to eradicate non-native plant species from the Preserve and enhance prairie habitat for species such as the vulnerable Lesser Prairie Chicken.

Grasslands are believed to be the most endangered ecosystem in North America. The National Grassland, Packsaddle, and Four Canyon preserve a significant remnant of mixed grass prairie and free-flowing prairie river.

See also
 List of protected grasslands of North America
 Grasslands of the Great Plains (U.S.)
 Native grasses of the Great Plains region

References

External links

 Black Kettle and McClellan Creek National Grasslands

National Grasslands of the United States
Grasslands of Oklahoma
Grasslands of Texas
Cibola National Forest
Protected areas of Roger Mills County, Oklahoma
Protected areas of Hemphill County, Texas
Protected areas established in 1960
1960 establishments in Oklahoma
1960 establishments in Texas